The egressive case (abbreviated ) marks the beginning of a movement from an approximate location or a moment in time.

This case is used in Udmurt and Veps languages (both belong to Uralic languages).

Example

Udmurt

References

Grammatical cases